The Dampierre nuclear power plant is located in the town of Dampierre-en-Burly (Loiret), 55 km upstream of Orleans and 110 km downstream of Nevers, it uses water from the Loire for cooling.

Approximately 1,100 people work at the site.

Seismic risk

According to a report by the Nuclear Safety Authority in October 2002, certain functions providing backup cooling for the reactor could not be ensured in the event of an earthquake.

Incidents 

On 2 April 2001, during a refueling outage of unit 4, an operator made a mistake in following the correct loading pattern for the different fuel rod assemblies (of which 30% were MOX fuel). The reloading operation was stopped and the core completely unloaded. The incident was initially classified at Level 1 of the INES scale, but reclassified as Level 2 by France's nuclear safety authority in 2007.

On the night of 9 to 10 April 2007, reactor No. 3 went on emergency standby and remained so throughout the night; it was supplied with emergency power by an emergency generator. EDF triggered an emergency plan to 22h10. Throughout the night, teams acted in emergency mode, the reactor No. 3 having been deprived of its external power. The emergency generator worked well. The ASN has established a national crisis with the support of the IRSN. EDF and DSC lifted the crisis the following morning at 8:15. Following this incident, the No. 3 reactor remained shut down for several weeks to correct the problem.

References

Nuclear power stations in France